Shegaftik-e Olya (also Romanized as Shegaftīk-e ‘Olyā; also known as Shegaftīk and Shekaftīk-e ‘Olyā) is a village in Beradust Rural District, Sumay-ye Beradust District, Urmia County, West Azerbaijan Province, Iran. At the 2006 census, its population was 230, in 46 families.

References 

Populated places in Urmia County